Direct-to-consumer  (DTC) or business-to-consumer (B2C) is the business model of selling products directly to customers and thereby bypassing any third-party retailers, wholesalers, or any other middlemen. Direct-to-consumer sales are usually transacted online, but direct-to-consumer brands may also operate  physical retail spaces as a complement to their main e-commerce platform  in a clicks-and-mortar business model.

History 

Direct-to-consumer became immensely popular during the dot-com bubble of the late 1990s when it was mainly used to refer to online retailers who sold products and services to consumers through the Internet.

This business model originated before modern transportation and electricity when people consumed  locally due to  geographical distance and business competition was more limited.

As  new modes of transport kept emerging (steamboat, train,  automobile, airplane),  consumers gained access to a  wider variety of goods and service providers, increasing business competition. 

The emergence of the Internet further increased access to many different types of goods and services, and increased competition meant that businesses had to put additional effort to win and keep customers.

Advantages and disadvantages 

Direct-to-consumer enjoys lower costs compared to physical retail, as it has reduced the number of different business components like employees, purchasing cost, mailing confirmation, renting or establishing a physical store.

DTC  enables smaller companies to compete with large and successful companies  in terms of price, availability of the products, and quality since costs are lower.
Direct-to-consumer sales can drive stronger brand loyalty and  customer  retention.   

The main risks in the online Direct-to-consumer are expanding liability risk, cyber risk and more  supply chain demands. DTC exposes a business to tasks that  would otherwise be taken up by wholesalers and retailers, such as shipping, labelling, and cybersecurity. Data privacy and cybersecurity are especially important in online businesses. Accepting online payments can make DTC businesses a target for hackers and cyber criminals, exposing them to the risks of fraudulent payments and false chargebacks.   The direct-to-consumer business model puts the entire burden of the supply chain onto the firm itself; rather than selling to only a few distributors,  the products must be delivered to many individual customers.

See also
 Retail
 Disintermediation
 Consumer-to-business
 Over-the-top media service
 Marketing channel
 Wholesale fashion distribution
 Types of e-commerce

References

Business terms
Retailing
Marketing strategy
Merchandising